Diospyros kaki, the Oriental persimmon, Chinese persimmon, Japanese persimmon or kaki persimmon, is the most widely cultivated species of the genus Diospyros. Although its first botanical description was not published until 1780, D. kaki is among the oldest cultivated plants, having been in use in China for more than 2000 years.

Names
Whether the species was first described by Carl Peter Thunberg or Carl Linnaeus the Younger is disputed. The scientific name Diospyros kaki L. f. may be used erroneously for this plant. However, Diospyros kaki L. f., published in 1781, is a later homonym of Diospyros kaki Thunb., published in 1780. So the name Diospyros kaki L. f. is taxonomically illegitimate and not accepted.

It is called shi (柿) in Chinese, kaki (柿) in Japanese, gam (감) in Korean, kesemek in Indonesia and haluwabed (हलुवाबेद) in Nepali.

Tree 

Its deciduous leaves are medium to dark green, broadly lanceolate, stiff and equally wide as long. Blooming from May to June, the trees are typically either male or female, but some produce both types of flowers. Furthermore, the sexual expression of a tree may vary from year to year. Unusually, the kaki fruits  ripen when the leaves have mostly fallen off the tree, typically in October and November. (Northern Hemisphere)

Pestalotiopsis fungal spp. causes leaf spot on Japanese persimmon.

Flower 
Kaki trees typically do not bear until they are 3 to 6 years old. The tubular flowers have a creamy white color. Female flowers grow singly, while male flowers sometimes may have a pink tint and tend to appear in clusters of three. Diospyros kaki is typically a dioecious species, which means that trees are either male or female, but some cultivated varieties are monoecious. In that case both male and female, and even perfect (male+female), flowers can be found on the same tree. The flowers have four crown-shaped sepals and four petals that form a large calyx.

All varieties (parthenocarpic) will produce seedless fruit in the absence of pollination, but their pollinated flowers will produce more fruit riddled with seeds. Kaki typically suffers very important fruit drop. The first flush of fruit drop happens shortly after flowering, when +/- 50% of the fruit will drop. The second flush happens in August when again many fruits will drop. After this, the rest of the fruit will usually stay on the tree and mature. Fruit drop depends on climatic conditions and water availability. Pollination is not necessary for fruit set, but it may help reduce fruit drop after averse climatic conditions or drought periods.

Fruit 

The persimmon is an edible sweet, slightly tangy fruit with a soft to occasionally fibrous texture. This species, native to China, is deciduous, with broad, stiff leaves. It was first cultivated in China more than 2000 years ago, and introduced to Japan in the 7th century and to Korea in the 14th century. It was later introduced to California and southern Europe in the 19th century, to Brazil in the 1890s. Numerous cultivars have been selected, and one variety is Diospyros kaki var. sylvestris Makino.

When ripe, the fruit comprises thick pulpy jelly encased in a waxy thin-skinned shell.
The smooth, shiny, thin shell ranges in shade from yellow to red-orange. The slightly lighter fleshed fruits can contain up to eight seeds and may have an astringent taste. With increasing maturity, the fruit softens, similar to a kiwifruit.

The high content of tannin in the still-immature kaki provides a bitter component reminiscent of a raw unpeeled chestnut, which weakens with progressive maturation. The furry taste, caused by the tannins, is reduced and finally completely disappears during the ripening process.

The astringent flavour can be removed by treatment with carbon dioxide.

Varieties

Kaki varieties are classified into four basic types, depending on the solubility of their tannin and the presence of seeds. Soluble tannin means that the fruit will have an acrid taste. Insoluble tannin means that there is no acrid taste. In some cases, the presence of seeds will turn the tannin insoluble in the whole of the fruit and in other cases only just around the seeds. this results in the following classification:
PCA type: Pollination constant astringent. These kakis have a bitter taste until they become completely soft. The ripening process turns the tannin insoluble, after which all bitterness disappears and the sweet fruit can be enjoyed.
PCNA type: Pollination constant non astringent, which is a relatively recent mutation in kaki fruit (a few centuries). In this type of kaki the tannin is always insoluble even when the fruit is still hard. This fruit will always taste sweet without any bitterness in the hard or soft stage.
PVNA type: Pollination variant non astringent. This type of fruit has to become soft before it is edible except if it is seeded. A substance in the seed makes the tannin insoluble and thus the seeded fruit will be sweet even when it is still hard. Even one seed is usually sufficient to make the fruit edible. Fruit from the same tree that does not contain seed will taste bitter and needs to soften before it becomes edible.
PVA type: Pollination variant astringent. This type of kaki is similar to the previous type but in this case only the flesh around the seeds will have no bitter taste. The rest of the fruit will taste bitter. This is due to a different process in tannin neutralization by the seeds. The result is that sometimes only half of the fruit (the part containing seeds) may be edible and the other half will be bitter if it contains no seeds.
Practically and commercially, only the first two kaki types are important. The other two types are considered astringent kakis for practical reasons and are handled just like the PCA type fruit.

Chemistry 
Apart from tannins, triterpenoid compounds such as α-amyrin, uvaol, ursolic acid, 19α-hydroxy ursolic acid and 19 α,24-dihydroxy ursolic acid can be isolated from the leaves of D. kaki.

The high content of the carotenoids beta-cryptoxanthin, beta-carotene, and zeaxanthin, along with some lutein and alpha-carotene makes the kaki fruit nutritionally valuable.

Cultivation 

Kaki are grown worldwide, with 90 percent of the total in China, Japan and Korea. In East Asia the main harvest time for kaki is in the months of October and November. The trees lose their leaves by harvest time. Occasionally, the brightly colored fruit is left unharvested on the tree as a decorative effect.

Cultivation of this species at first spread through East Asia. Since the 19th century, kaki partially replaced date-plum (Diospyros lotus, also known as Caucasian persimmon) in some countries in South Europe and West Asia, because kaki have bigger fruits than date-plum; cultivation in California began at that time.

The "Sharon" is a trade name for the "Triumph" variety grown in the fertile Plain of Sharon in Israel. It is a PCA variety which is always treated with carbon dioxide (CO₂) gas to remove astringency before it is marketed. This kaki has a rather squarish shape and it has one of the highest sugar contents of all varieties. Unlike most other varieties, it has a very firm skin which gives it good keeping qualities and good resistance to handling.

In Spain, the most important kaki variety is "Rojo Brillante". This PCA variety is mostly grown in the Valencia region in a protected region of origin (DOP) called the "Ribera del Xuquer". During the last decade a CO₂ treatment procedure has been perfected by which nearly all Rojo Brillante kakis are treated to remove astringency while still retaining their firmness and keeping qualities. This treated kaki fruit is marketed as Spanish Persimon (with one 'm'). Because of this treatment, the "Rojo brillante" kaki has become an easily edible fruit highly appreciated internationally, with increased production.

In Italy the most widely grown variety is "Tipo" (PCA) and some other varieties in smaller quantities. Italy used to be the largest kaki exporting country in Europe, but export diminished significantly as the Spanish kaki succeeded. This drop in export is entirely due to the fact that until now Italian kakis are not CO₂ treated and thus can only be eaten after they have turned soft. Italy has recently developed a CO₂ treatment procedure that can be used on the Tipo variety but it is not commonly used yet.

Kaki is also produced in Albania, mainly in the Elbasan region. Since 1935–40, it is also grown in small quantities in Bulgaria, particularly in the Upper Thracian Plain and on the Bulgarian Black Sea Coast.

In astringent cultivars (cultivated varieties), the fruit has a high proanthocyanidin-type tannin content which makes the immature fruit astringent and bitter. The tannin levels are reduced as the fruit matures. The fruit of those cultivars is not edible in its crisp, firm state; they're edible when soft ripe. The ripe fruit has a soft jelly-like consistency. The Japanese 'Hachiya' is a widely grown astringent cultivar. Other cultivars, such as 'Fuyu', do not contain tannins when firm. Those can be eaten like an apple or can be allowed to go to any stage of ripeness, including to the jelly-like stage. These non-astringent varieties are, however, considered to have a less complex flavor.

United States
In the United States most diospyros kaki production takes place in the states of Florida and California. The first commercial orchards in Florida were planted in the 1870s. Most persimmon orchards in the US are small scale (70% less than 1 acre and 90% less than 5 acres).

In culture 

Throughout Asia, healing properties are attributed to the kaki. They are said to be helpful against stomach ailments and diarrhea. Immature fruits are said to be a treatment for fever, if they ripen in containers until they are sweet as honey. The juice of unripe fruit is said to lower blood pressure and the fruit stem to relieve a cough. To reinforce these effects, the fruit is peeled before use, exposed to the sunlight during the day and to the dew at night, until a white powdery coating forms.

A vase adorned with a kaki cake, a pine branch and an orange is a symbol of the desire for "great happiness in 100 affairs."

Consumption 

The leaves are commonly removed before serving. Though the skin is often removed, it may be eaten, especially when the fruit has ripened and the tannins have significantly broken down, reducing the astringency. They can also be dried; two fruits are attached to a string which is then hung over a pole.

In Korea, it is usually eaten as a dessert or when there are guests at home. The persimmon is cut into sections and the skin and core is usually removed. Persimmons are eaten dry during the winter, and they are very popular amongst children. In autumn, families and farmers from the rural areas collect persimmons and hang them to dry. Powdered sugar is sometimes added to enhance the sweetness.

Persimmon vinegar may be made from Oriental persimmons.

References 

kaki
Plants described in 1780
Crops originating from China
Trees of China
Ornamental trees
Persimmon
Japanese fruit
Fruit trees